Lyudmyla Kovalenko or Liudmyla Kovalenko (née Liakhovich; born 26 June 1989, Berdychiv) is a Ukrainian and a Belarusian athlete. Kovalenko won the silver medal at the 2012 European Championships in Helsinki in the 5000 m with result 15:12.03.  She is currently (April 2018) serving a doping ban.

References

External links 

1989 births
Living people
People from Berdychiv
Ukrainian female middle-distance runners
Ukrainian female long-distance runners
Ukrainian female marathon runners
Belarusian female middle-distance runners
Belarusian female long-distance runners
Belarusian female marathon runners
Olympic athletes of Ukraine
Athletes (track and field) at the 2012 Summer Olympics
European Athletics Championships medalists
Doping cases in athletics
Sportspeople from Zhytomyr Oblast